Pankaj Bikram Nebmang is the current President of the All Nepal Football Association.

References

Year of birth missing (living people)
Living people